The Almost Perfect Crime, also known as Delitto quasi perfetto and Imperfect Murder, is a 1966 Italian crime-comedy film written and directed by Mario Camerini.

Cast 
 Philippe Leroy: Paolo Respighi 
 Pamela Tiffin: Annie Robson 
 Graziella Granata: Annie #2 
 Bernard Blier: Colonel Robson 
 Massimo Serato: Preston 
 Fernando Sancho: Omar 
 Luciano Pigozzi: Salah  
 Giulio Donnini: Foster 
 Ignazio Leone: Mazzullo

References

External links

1966 films
1960s crime comedy films
Films directed by Mario Camerini
Films scored by Carlo Rustichelli
Italian crime comedy films
1966 comedy films
1960s Italian films